Teruchiyo Takamiya (born 18 February 1942) is a Japanese equestrian. He competed in the team jumping event at the 1972 Summer Olympics.

References

1942 births
Living people
Japanese male equestrians
Olympic equestrians of Japan
Equestrians at the 1972 Summer Olympics
Place of birth missing (living people)